Chhetri (Kshetri, Kshettri, Kshetry or Chhettri), (IAST: Kṣetrī) historically called Kshettriya or Kshetriya or Khas are Nepali speakers of Khas community, some of whom trace their origin to migration from medieval India. Chhetri was a caste of administrators, governor and military elites in the medieval Khas Kingdom and Gorkha Kingdom (later unified Kingdom of Nepal). The nobility of the Gorkha Kingdom mainly originated from Chhetri families. They also had a strong presence in civil administration affairs. The bulk of prime ministers of Nepal before the democratization of Nepal belonged to this caste as a result of the old Gorkhali aristocracy. Gorkha-based aristocratic Chhetri families included the Pande dynasty, the Basnyat dynasty, the Kunwar family, and the Thapa dynasty, (Rana dynasty and other Kunwars).

Khas Chhetris were traditionally considered a division of the Khas people with Khas Brahmin (commonly called Khas Bahun). They make up 16.6% of Nepal's population according to the 2011 Nepal census, making them the most populous caste or ethnic community in Nepal. Chhetris speak an Indo-Aryan Nepali language (Khas-Kura) as mother tongue.

Etymology and background
Chhetri is considered a direct derivative of the Sanskrit word Kshatriya. According to the 1854 Legal Code (Muluki Ain) of Nepal, Chhetris are the social group among the sacred thread bearers (Tagadhari) and twice-born people of the Hindu tradition. Almost all Chhetris are Hindu.

History

They are thought to be connected to the Khasas mentioned in the ancient Indian literature and the medieval Khasa kingdom.

In the early modern history of Nepal, Chhetris played a key role in the Unification of Nepal, providing the core of the Gorkhali army of the mid-18th century. Bir Bhadra Thapa was a Thapa of Chhetri group and leading Bharadar during Unification of Nepal. His grandson Bhimsen Thapa became Mukhtiyar (Prime Minister) of Nepal. Swarup Singh Karki, a leading politician and military officer, belonged to Chhetri family. Abhiman Singh Basnyat of Basnyat dynasty and Damodar Pande of Pande dynasty were both members of Chhetri caste. Jung Bahadur Rana, founder of Rana dynasty also belonged to the Chhetri community.

During the monarchy, Chhetris continued to dominate the ranks of the Nepalese government, Nepalese Army, Nepalese Police and administration.

Chhetri noble families

The most prominent feature of Nepalese Chhetri society has been the ruling Shah dynasty (1768–2008), the Rana Prime Ministers (1846–1953), Pande family, Thapa family, Basnyat family,. that marginalized the monarchy, and the Chhetri presence in the armed forces, police, and Government of Nepal. In traditional and administrative professions, Chhetris were given favorable treatment by the royal government.

Chhetri and premiership
The nobility of Gorkha were mainly from Chhetri families and they had a strong presence in civil administration affairs. All of the Prime Minister of Nepal between 1768 and 1950 were Chhetris with the exception of Ranga Nath Poudyal, being a Brahmin. These number varied after the democratization of Nepal. Between 1951 and 1997, out of the 16 Prime Ministers of Nepal, 5 of them were Chhetris.

Military achievements

Chhetri had dominated high military positions and monopolized the military force at the times of Chhetri autocratic administrators like PM Bhimsen Thapa and PM Jung Bahadur Rana. There were 12 Basnyats, 16 Pandes, 6 Thapas and 3 Kunwar officers totalling to 51 Chhetri officers in the year 1841  A.D. The most prominent officers at Shah administration were the Kazis which had control over civil and military functions like a Minister and Military officer combined. Rana Jang Pande, the leader of Pande faction, was the Prime Minister of Nepal in 1841  A.D. which might have caused large Pande officers at 1841. After the rise Rana dynasty(Kunwars), the number changed to 10 Basnyats, 1 Pandes, 3 Thapas and 26 Kunwar officers totaling to 61 Chhetri officers in the year 1854  A.D.

Chhetris dominated the position of the senior officers of the Nepali Army comprising 74.4% of total senior officers in 1967. Similarly, Chhetris composed of 38.1%, 54.3% and 55.3% of the senior officers in the year 2003, 2004 and 2007 respectively.

Clans & surnames
Clans of the Chhetri include:
Adhikari
 Baniya
Basnet
Bisht
Bhandari
Bohra
Burathoki
Chauhan
Gharti
Karki
Khadka
Khatri/Khatri Chhetri (K.C.)
Khulal
Kunwar
Pande/पाँडे (not to be mistaken with Brahmin Pande)
Rana
Raut
Rawal
Rayamajhi
Rokka
Thapa

Demographics
The 2011 Nepal census recorded Chhetris as the largest Hindu adherents in the nation with 4,365,113 people which is 99.3% of total Chhetri population. In Nepal's hill districts the Chhetri population rises to 41% compared to 31% Brahmin and 27% other castes. This greatly exceeds the Kshatriya portion in most regions with predominantly Hindu populations.

Chhetris are largest caste group in 21 districts of Nepal as per 2001 Nepal census and 24 districts as per 2011 Nepal census. These twenty four districts are - Dhankuta district, Sankhuwasabha district, Okhaldhunga district, Udayapur district, Ramechhap district, Dolakha District, Salyan district, Surkhet district, Dailekh district, Jajarkot district, Dolpa district, Jumla district, Mugu district, Humla district, Bajura district, Bajhang district, Achham district, Doti district, Kailali district, Dadeldhura district, Baitadi district, Darchula district, Kalikot district and Kanchanpur district. Among them, the district with largest Chhetri population is Kathmandu district with 347,754 (i.e. 19.9% of the total district population). The literacy rate among Chhetris is 72.3% as per 2011 Nepal census.

As per the Public Service Commission of Nepal, Brahmins (33.3%) and Chhetris (20.01%) were two largest caste group to obtain governmental jobs in the fiscal year 2017–18, even though 45% governmental seats are reserved for women, Madhesis, lower caste and tribes, and other marginalized groups.

Present day

Chhetri together with Bahun and thakuri  falls under Khas Arya, who are denied quota and reservations in civil services and other sectors due to their history of socio-political dominance in Nepal. There are no quotas for the Khas community who fall under Bahun-Chhetri-thakuri hierarchy. As per the explanation of legal provisions of Constitution of Nepal, Khas Arya comprises the Brahmin, Kshetri, Thakur and Sanyasi (Dashnami) communities. But they are allowed reservation in federal parliament and provincial legislature. The European Union has been accused of direct interference, creating ethnic strife and negative discrimination towards Khas Arya due to their recommendation to remove the reservation for Khas Aryas.

Notable people
Bir Bhadra Thapa and Thapa dynasty
Swarup Singh Karki
Abhiman Singh Basnyat and Basnyat dynasty
Damodar Pande and Pande dynasty
Jung Bahadur Rana  and Rana dynasty
Amar Singh Thapa (sanu)
Queen Subarna Prabha Devi
Bhimsen Thapa
Gagan Singh Bhandari
Mohan Shamsher Jang Bahadur Rana
Sher Bahadur Thapa
Kunwar Inderjit Singh
Subarna Shamsher Rana
Surya Bahadur Thapa
Sunil Chhetri, football player

See also
Caste system in Nepal
Ethnic groups in Nepal
Kshatriya
Caste system in India
Varna (Hinduism)

References

Footnotes

Notes

Sources

Further reading

Ethnic groups in Nepal
Castes
Ethnic groups in India
Khas people
Kshatriya communities
Ethnic groups in Northeast India
Ethnic groups in South Asia